is a Japanese artistic gymnast. In 2019, he won the gold medal in the team event and the silver medal in the men's all-around event at the 2019 Junior World Artistic Gymnastics Championships held in Győr, Hungary. In the floor exercise he finished in 4th place.

In 2016, he won the silver medal in the junior men's floor exercise at the 2016 Pacific Rim Gymnastics Championships held in Everett, Washington, United States.

References

External links 

 

Living people
2002 births
Place of birth missing (living people)
Japanese male artistic gymnasts
Medalists at the Junior World Artistic Gymnastics Championships
21st-century Japanese people